Hen 2-428 is a planetary nebula with a binary double white dwarf system core. This core star system is the first discovered candidate for Type Ia supernova through binary white dwarf merger process. At the time of its discovery, the star system at the core was the heaviest known double white dwarf binary star system.

Planetary nebula
The planetary nebula is asymmetric, which is the result of there being not a single star, but a binary system at the heart of the nebula.

Binary double white dwarf
The binary nature of the star at the centre of the nebula was discovered in 2014, when a study of why the nebula was not regular was conducted, resolving the previously thought single star into a double star. The two white dwarf stars forming the binary star system at the heart of the nebula orbit each other with a period of about 4 hours. The two stars have a combined mass of about 1.8 solar masses, with each star being slightly less massive than the Sun. As of 2015, they are the most massive binary double white dwarf star system known.

Progenitor system for potential Type-Ia supernova
The pair are expected to merge into a single star in about 700 million years, whereupon they will explode in a Type Ia supernova. The inspiralling of the stars is caused by the emission of gravitational waves, resulting in the loss of orbital energy. The explosion is due to the combined mass of the merged star exceeding the Chandrasekhar limit of 1.4 solar masses. This is the first candidate for binary double white dwarf star merger progenitor Type Ia supernova star system known. The system is important to astrophysicists as Type Ia supernovae are used as standard candles to measure the distance to faraway objects, thus understanding the process is important to regularize and quantify the variations in the standard candle to reduce the error uncertainty in determining distance.

Further reading

References

See also
All double-degenerate binary stars known in 2015
 V458 Vul
 SBS 1150+599A
 nucleus of TS 01
 MT Ser 
 nucleus of Abell 41
 NGC 6026
 Fg 1

Planetary nebulae
White dwarfs
Binary stars
Articles containing video clips
Aquila (constellation)